Gobiendes is one of 13 parishes (administrative divisions) in the Colunga municipality, within the province and autonomous community of Asturias, in northern Spain. 

The population is 295 (INE 2007).

Villages
 Coceña
 Gobiendes
 Lloroñi

Parishes in Colunga